Jiuzhan–Jiangmifeng railway or Jiujiang railway, is a single-track arterial railroad in Northeast China.

Rail junctions
 Xinjiuzhan: Changchun–Tumen railway
 Jiangmifeng: Changchun–Tumen railway

See also
 List of railways in China

References

Railway lines in China
Rail transport in Jilin